Heparan-α-glucosaminide N-acetyltransferase (also called "acetyl-CoA:heparan-α-D-glucosaminide N-acetyltransferase" and "acetyl-CoA:alpha-glucosaminide N-acetyltransferase") is an enzyme that in humans is encoded by the HGSNAT gene.

In enzymology, this enzyme belongs to the family of transferases, specifically those acyltransferases transferring groups other than aminoacyl groups. It is catalysed in the chemical reaction:

acetyl-CoA + heparan sulfate α-D-glucosaminide  CoA + heparan sulfate N-acetyl-α-D-glucosaminide

This enzyme participates in glycosaminoglycan degradation and glycan structures degradation. Mutations in the gene encoding this enzyme cause mucopolysaccharidosis IIIC.

References

Further reading

 
 

EC 2.3.1
Enzymes of unknown structure